Turks in Kazakhstan are ethnic Turks who live in Kazakhstan, mostly from Meskheti after the Deportation of the Meskhetian Turks.

History

Ottoman migration

The First All-Union Census of the Soviet Union in 1926 recorded 8,570 Ottoman Turks living in the Soviet Union. The Ottoman Turks are no longer listed separately in the census, it is presumed that those who were living in Kazakhstan have either been assimilated into Kazakh society or have left the country.

Meskhetian Turks migration

During World War II, the Soviet Union was preparing to launch a pressure campaign against Turkey. Vyacheslav Molotov, then Minister of Foreign Affairs, demanded to the Turkish Ambassador in Moscow for the surrender of three Anatolian provinces (Kars, Ardahan and Artvin). Thus, war against Turkey seemed possible, and Joseph Stalin wanted to clear the strategic Turkish population situated in Meskheti, near the Turkish-Georgian border. Nationalistic policies at the time encouraged the slogan: "Georgia for Georgians" and that the Meskhetian Turks should be sent to Turkey "where they belong". By 1944, the Meskhetian Turks were forcefully deported from Meskheti and accused of smuggling, banditry and espionage in collaboration with their kin across the Turkish border. Thus, large settlements of Meskhetian Turks were formed in Kazakhstan and they were not permitted by the Georgian government of Zviad Gamsakhurdia to return to their homeland.

In the last Soviet Census, conducted in 1989, there were 207,500 Meskhetian Turks in the Soviet Union and over 23.8% were registered in Kazakhstan.

Demographics 

Although the last Soviet census recorded a low figure of 207,269 Turks, this may have not counted all ethnic Turks, because for many years, Turks were denied the right to register their nationality in legal documents. Thus, in Kazakhstan, only a third of them were recorded as Turks on their passports. The rest had been arbitrarily declared members of other ethnic groups.

According to academics there are 150,000 Turks who reside in Kazakhstan. 45,000 in Almaty, 40,000 in South Kazakhstan, 36,000 in Zhambil and 10,000 in Qyzylorda.

Education 
Due to historical links between Turkish and Kazakh people, the Turks living in Kazakhstan are well provided. The Hoca Ahmet Yesevi International Kazakh-Turkish University was established in Turkistan of Kazakhstan in 1993 and has around 20,000 students. It is one of the leading universities in the country. There is also 28 Kazakh-Turkish high schools, one university and one primary school which are operated by private Turkish foundations. There is also one Turkish Language Teaching Center in Almaty.

Notable people
Tevfik Arif, businessman; founder of the Bayrock Group (Turkish Meskhetian origin)
Mukhtar Mukhtarov, football player 
Fatih Osmanlı, actor in the Turkish historical drama Kuruluş: Osman (Turkish Meskhetian origin)
Ravil Tagir, football player (Turkish Meskhetian origin)

See also 
Kazakhstan–Turkey relations
Turkic Council
Turks in the former Soviet Union

References

Bibliography 
 
.
.
 
.
.
.
.
.
.
.
.
 .
.
 .

External links 

Kazakhstan
Kazakhstan
Ethnic groups in Kazakhstan